This article presents a list of the historical events and publications of Australian literature during 1933.

Books 

 Miles Franklin – Bring the Monkey
 Ion Idriess – Drums of Mer
 G. B. Lancaster
 Pageant
 The World is Yours
 Norman Lindsay
 Pan in the Parlour
 Saturdee
 Louise Mack – Teens Triumphant
 Jack McLaren – The Money Stones
 Alice Grant Rosman – Protecting Margot
 Arthur W. Upfield – The Great Melbourne Cup Mystery

Short stories 

 Katharine Susannah Prichard – "The Bride of Far-Away"
 Henry Handel Richardson
 "The Professor's Experiment"
 "The Wrong Turning"

Children's and Young Adult 

 Mary Grant Bruce – Billabong's Luck
 Kenneth Slessor – Funny Farmyard
 Dorothy Wall – Blinky Bill: The Quaint Little Australian

Poetry 

 E. J. Brady – Wardens of the Seas : Poems
 C. J. Dennis – "Tall Timber"
 John Manifold – Verses 1930–1933
 A. B. Paterson – The Animals Noah Forgot
 Kenneth Slessor – Darlinghurst Nights

Awards and honours

Literary

Births 

A list, ordered by date of birth (and, if the date is either unspecified or repeated, ordered alphabetically by surname) of births in 1933 of Australian literary figures, authors of written works or literature-related individuals follows, including year of death.

 3 June – Vivian Smith, poet
 30 June – John Button, writer and politician (died 2008)
 4 July – Fay Zwicky, poet and critic (died 2017)
 10 July – Kevin Gilbert, poet and playwright (died 1993)
 14 August – Bryce Courtenay, novelist (died 2012)
21 December – Wendy Richardson, playwright

Unknown date
 Jennifer Strauss, poet and academic

Deaths 

A list, ordered by date of death (and, if the date is either unspecified or repeated, ordered alphabetically by surname) of deaths in 1933 of Australian literary figures, authors of written works or literature-related individuals follows, including year of birth.

 2 February – John Le Gay Brereton, poet (born 1871)
 1 April – Gilbert White, clergyman and poet (born 1859)
 15 April – Alfred Stephens, writer and critic (born 1865)
 27 August – George Robertson, publisher (born 1860)
 6 November – Grant Hervey, poet (born 1880)

See also 
 1933 in poetry
 List of years in literature
 List of years in Australian literature
1933 in literature
1932 in Australian literature
1933 in Australia
1934 in Australian literature

References

Literature
Australian literature by year
20th-century Australian literature